is a Japanese footballer who playing as a midfielder. He currently play for Suzuka Point Getters.

Career statistics

Club
.

Notes

References

External links

1993 births
Living people
Sportspeople from Hyōgo Prefecture
Association football people from Hyōgo Prefecture
Kokushikan University alumni
Japanese footballers
Association football midfielders
Japan Football League players
J3 League players
Vissel Kobe players
Vanraure Hachinohe players
MIO Biwako Shiga players
 Suzuka Point Getters players